The Tribeca Film Festival Award for Best Actress is one of the annual film award given by the Tribeca Film Festival, since 2003.

Winners

Best Actress in an International Feature Film
 2020 – Shira Haas in Asia
 2019 – Park Ji-hoo in House of Hummingbird
 2018 – Joy Rieger in Virgins
 2017 – Marie Leuenberger in The Divine Order
 2016 – Radhika Apte in Madly (in the segment Clean Shaven)

Best Actress in a U.S. Narrative Feature Film
 2020 – Assol Abdulina in Materna
2019 – Haley Bennett in Swallow
 2018 – Alia Shawkat  in Duck Butter
 2017 – Nadia Alexander in Blame
 2016 – Mackenzie Davis in Always Shine

Best Actress in a Narrative Feature Film
 2015 – Hannah Murray in Bridgend
 2014 – Valeria Bruni Tedeschi in Human Capital
 2013 – Veerle Baetens in The Broken Circle Breakdown
 2012 – Rachel Mwanza in War Witch
 2011 – Carice van Houten in Black Butterflies
 2010 – Sibel Kekilli in When We Leave
 2009 – Zoe Kazan in The Exploding Girl
 2008 – Eileen Walsh in Eden
 2007 – Marina Hands in Lady Chatterley
 2006 – Eva Holubová in Holiday Makers
 2005 – Felicity Huffman in Transamerica
 2004 – Fernanda Montenegro in O Outro Lado da Rua
 2003 – Valeria Bruni Tedeschi in It's Easier for a Camel...

See also
 Tribeca Film Institute

External links
 Tribeca Film Festival – Official Site

Awards established in 2003
Film awards for lead actress
Tribeca